In chemistry, there are two types of three-center bonds:

Three-center two-electron bond, found in electron-deficient compounds such as boranes
Three-center four-electron bond, found in hypervalent compounds such as the noble gas compounds